Thibault Tricole (born 11 October 1989) is a French professional darts player who currently plays in World Darts Federation (WDF) and Professional Darts Corporation (PDC) events. He is a first French player to advance to final of the World Darts Championship and most successful darts player to come from France.

Career
Since 2010, Tricole has occasionally competed in British Darts Organisation and World Darts Federation tournaments, including several times at the Winmau World Masters, but without any notable success. In 2019, he tried his hand at the Q-School of the PDC for the first time, but was unable to secure a tour card. During the year, he played significantly more British Darts Organisation tournaments than in previous years and was able to win his first tournaments at the Torremolinos Open and Greek Open. He also reached fourth round at the 2019 World Masters. He was also in finals at the Belfry Open, Malta Open and Italian Open.

Tricole was the first Frenchman ever to qualify for the 2020 BDO World Darts Championship as a Western European Qualifier. In the preliminary round he beat Ross Montgomery in a sudden-death leg. In the first round, Tricole lost 1–3 by sets to Ryan Hogarth. Tricole narrowly missed out on a tour card at Q-School in 2020, and the Frenchman won the Isle of Man Masters in March. In 2021, Tricole reached the semi-finals on the PDC Challenge Tour once. At the beginning of October, he won the Denmark Open with a 6–3 over Andreas Harrysson in the final and a little later he also won the Welsh Classic.

In 2022, there was another attempt at the Q-School, but again without the success of the tour card. At the end of March, Tricole advanced to his first two Players Championships. In April, the Frenchman went into the 2022 WDF World Darts Championship as seed and survived a few match darts in his first round match against Shawn Burt. Things went better against Steve Hine, whom he defeated 3–1 in sets. He also narrowly eliminated Andy Baetens with 4–3 in sets, and in the decider he also defeated Cameron Menzies and thus made it into the final. Tricole managed to become the first Frenchman to reach a World Darts Championship final where he ended up being defeated by Neil Duff 5–6 in sets.

His PDC European Tour debut at the 2022 Austrian Darts Open was narrowly lost in the decider leg against Zoran Lerchbacher. At the Players Championship tournaments as a substitute for other Pro Tour players, Tricole made it into the third round. His second PDC European Tour appearance was at the 2022 Hungarian Darts Trophy, where he lost 4–6 in legs to Karel Sedlacek in the first round. In June, Tricole took part in the 2022 Dutch Open. He defeated few Netherlands players on the way to the semi-finals, where he lost to eventual champion Jelle Klaasen 1–2 in sets.

World Championship results

BDO/WDF
 2020: First round (lost to Ryan Hogarth 1–3)
 2022: Runner-up (lost to Neil Duff 5–6)
 2023:

Career finals

WDF major finals: (1 runner-up)

Performance timeline

References

Living people
French darts players
1989 births
Professional Darts Corporation associate players 
British Darts Organisation players

External links